Henbadhoo (Dhivehi: ހެނބަދޫ) is one of the inhabited islands of Noonu Atoll.

Geography

Demography

References

Islands of the Maldives
Populated places in the Maldives